Perth was a royal burgh that returned one commissioner to the Parliament of Scotland and to the Convention of Estates.

After the Acts of Union 1707, Perth, Cupar, Dundee, Forfar and St Andrews formed the Perth district of burghs, returning one member between them to the House of Commons of Great Britain.

List of burgh commissioners

 1661–63: John Paterson of Benchillis  
 1665 convention, 1667 convention, 1669–74: Patrick Threipland of Fingask, merchant, provost
 1678 convention: Patrick Hay, merchant, provost 
 1681–82, 1685–86: John Glass, provost 
 1689 convention, 1689–1701: Robert Smith, former baillie  
 1702–07: Alexander Robertson of Craig

References

See also
 List of constituencies in the Parliament of Scotland at the time of the Union

Burghs represented in the Parliament of Scotland (to 1707)
Constituencies disestablished in 1707
History of Perth, Scotland
Politics of Perth and Kinross
1707 disestablishments in Scotland